The Robert Burns Academy (Scottish Gaelic: Acadamaidh Robert Burns) is a secondary school located in Cumnock, East Ayrshire, Scotland, which opened to pupils in October 2020 following the merger of Cumnock Academy and Auchinleck Academy. The current Head Teacher, Peter Gilchrist, also acts as the Head of Barony Campus, meaning he has the responsibility of leading the whole Barony Campus which consists of Robert Burns Academy, Lochnorris Primary School, Cherry Trees Early Childhood Centre and Hillside School.

In 2022, Robert Burns Academy was ranked as the 288th best performing state school in Scotland, which was an increase from its 2021 ranking where the school ranked 340th.

Robert Burns Academy, as well as the overall Barony Campus, is the largest educational provision in Scotland.

History

The proposal for the creation of a new multi-million pound new "super school" in the Cumnock area was announced in November 2014, with parents/carers of children attending the current schools at that time that would be affected by the proposed closure and creation of a new school campus being consulted.

Initial opening of the new Barony Campus and Robert Burns Academy was delayed due to the ongoing Coronavirus outbreak which resulted in construction work being halted at the site for a period. The school campus eventually opened to pupils in October 2020.

Barony Campus

Robert Burns Academy is part of a 3-18 campus known as the Barony Campus. Within the campus are:

 Robert Burns Academy
 Lochnorris Primary School
 Cherry Trees Early Childhood Centre
 Hillside School

Each of the four educational establishments is led by its own Head Teacher, with Peter Gilchrist serving as the overall Head of Campus, as well as Head Teacher of Robert Burns Academy.

Staffing

As one of the largest schools in Scotland in terms of pupil population, Robert Burns Academy has a large number of staff consisting of;

 1 Head Teacher (also Head of Campus)
 6 Depute Head Teachers 
 1 Head of Inclusion hub provision 
 9 Principal Teachers of Pupil Support 
 Class teachers across different educational departments 
 Support, clerical and janitorial staff

See also

 Lists of schools in Scotland

References

External links
 Barony Campus at East Ayrshire Council
 School website

Secondary schools in East Ayrshire
Cumnock
Educational institutions established in 2020
2020 establishments in Scotland